I Am Greta is a 2020 internationally co-produced documentary film directed by Nathan Grossman, following climate change activist Greta Thunberg. The film had its world premiere at the 77th Venice International Film Festival on 3 September 2020, and was released on Hulu on 13 November 2020.

Production
In December 2019, it was announced Nathan Grossman would direct the film documenting Greta Thunberg, with Hulu distributing.

Release
I Am Greta had its world premiere at the 77th Venice International Film Festival on 3 September 2020. It also screened at the Toronto International Film Festival on 11 September 2020 and at the Filmfest Hamburg on 3 October 2020. The film was released in the United Kingdom and Germany on 16 October 2020 by Dogwoof and Filmwelt. It was released in the United States on 13 November 2020.

Reception
The website's critics consensus reads, "Audiences might not learn anything new from I Am Greta, but its stirring chronicle of the young activist's efforts is inspiring." On Metacritic, the film has a weighted average score of 69 out of 100, based on 20 critics, indicating "generally favorable reviews".

References

External links
 
 
 I Am Greta at Box Office Mojo

2020 documentary films
2020 films
Documentary films about global warming
Films about activists
Greta Thunberg
Hulu original films
Swedish documentary films
American documentary films
British documentary films
German documentary films
Documentary films about women
Films scored by Jon Ekstrand
2020s American films
2020s British films